Brancaster is a village and civil parish on the north coast of the English county of Norfolk. The civil parish of Brancaster comprises Brancaster itself, together with Brancaster Staithe and Burnham Deepdale. The three villages form a more or less continuous settlement along the A149 at the edge of the Brancaster Manor marshland and the Scolt Head Island National Nature Reserve.
For the purposes of local government, the parish falls within the district of King's Lynn and West Norfolk. Janet Lake, the clerk to Brancaster Parish Council, has recently reached 50 years of service in the post.

The villages name means 'Roman site of Branodunum', where the original Romano-British name may be preserved in the first element. The name is from British bran(n)o, 'crow/raven' possibly used as a personal name, and duno-, 'fortification'. Alternatively, perhaps, 'broomy Roman site'.

St Mary's church at Burnham Deepdale is one of 124 existing round-tower churches in Norfolk; it also has a carved Norman font.

Geography and geology
A petrified forest can be seen on the foreshore near Brancaster at low tide. It is about three-quarters of a mile west of the golf clubhouse and consists of material similar to compacted peat or brown coal (lignite). Remains also wash ashore after storms and can be found along the high tide line. The material resembles black rubber but can be broken easily to reveal plant remains inside.

Governance
An electoral ward in the same name exists. This ward had a population at the 2011 Census of 1,293.

Branodunum – Roman settlement

There was a Roman fort and settlement here named Branodunum to the east of the modern village. The Saxon Shore fort (and the related civilian settlement, much of which was destroyed during the construction of a locally opposed housing development in the 1970s) is visible only as grass-covered mounds and remains mainly unexcavated.

Shipwreck on the beach

The wreck that used to be visible at low tide but has now been almost completely covered by the westerly drifting sand was the 1021grt coaster SS Vina which was used for target practice by the RAF before accidentally sinking in 1944. The Vina was built at Leith by Ramage & Ferguson in 1894 and was registered at Grangemouth. She was a coast-hugging general cargo ship which would have worked the crossings between the east coast of England and through to the Baltic states.

As she neared the end of her useful seagoing life in 1940, Vina was requisitioned as a naval vessel for wartime use as a blockship, carrying a crew of 12. With Great Yarmouth being a strategic port on the east coast, the ultimate fate for the ship would have been to have had her hold filled with concrete and explosives and she would have been sunk at the harbour mouth, blocking entry in the event of a Nazi invasion. Once this threat passed, she was taken out of blockship service and towed up the east coast towards Brancaster where she was used as a target for the RAF before the planned invasion of Normandy in 1944.

Originally anchored further out to sea on the Titchwell side as a target for cannon shell trials, she dragged her anchor on 20 August 1944, in a north-westerly gale and ran ashore. Numerous efforts have been made to remove the wreck from the sandbank as the ship is not only a danger to navigation but also attracts holiday makers who walk out to the vessel's remains at low tide. Various parts have been removed and, in 1968, her bronze propeller was blown off by salvagers and floated across the harbour channel. Removal efforts have long been abandoned as uneconomic.

Lives have been lost due to ill-advised attempts to reach the Vina as it is on the far side of a fast-flowing tidal harbour channel. Local lifeboats and RAF rescue helicopters have been pressed into service on many occasions. A warning sign on the wreck advises anyone reaching it to return to the beach immediately.

National Trust and the beach
The beach area and some of the marshes are managed by the National Trust.

Royal West Norfolk Golf Club
The village is home to the Royal West Norfolk Golf Club., it was founded in 1892, its design being from Holcombe Ingleby.  In 2014 it was listed as the 47th best golf course in the UK and Ireland by Golf Monthly magazine.

Space programme
In the 1950s and 60s, Brancaster was considered as a possible location for the launching site for the British space programme. This idea was expanded to include the village becoming the base for a facility that could be used by a spaceplane to undertake secret flights over the USSR. Development would have meant that the village would probably have been razed and the villagers rehoused.

The eventual installation of oil rigs in the North Sea saw the idea shelved, as the risk, however slight, of atmospheric re-entry material hitting the rigs, was too great.

War Memorial
Brancaster's War Memorial is located in St. Mary the Virgin's Churchyard and is a stone Celtic cross. It lists the following names for the First World War:
 Captain Charles Simms-Reeve (1885-1915), 2nd Battalion, East Surrey Regiment
 Petty-Officer Herbert W. Harrell (1878-1914), HMS Cressy
 Staff-Sergeant Robert E. Loynes (1882-1918), 258th (Siege) Battery, Royal Garrison Artillery
 Chief-Stoker P. Isaac Winterborne (1878-1917), HMS Vanguard
 Lance-Corporal Albert J. West (1893-1916), 8th Battalion, East Surrey Regiment
 Lance-Corporal Bede Guthrie (1896-1917), 1/5th Battalion, Gloucestershire Regiment
 Lance-Corporal Charles R. Raven (1889-1917), 9th Battalion, Royal Norfolk Regiment
 Lance-Corporal Charles W. Ranson (1893-1918), 1st Battalion, Welsh Guards
 Private Ernest Petchey (1887-1917), 7th Battalion, Bedfordshire Regiment
 Private Thomas W. Youngs (1892-1917), 7th Battalion, Border Regiment
 Private John W. Nudds (d.1917), 1st Battalion, East Surrey Regiment
 Private Herbert R. Martin (1881-1916), 12th Battalion, East Surrey Regiment
 Private Andrew M. King (d.1917), 1st Battalion, Essex Regiment
 Private Herbert Woodbine (d.1918), 14th Battalion, Gloucestershire Regiment
 Private Russel Southerland (1896-1917), 120th Company, Machine Gun Corps
 Private John H. Britton (d.1916), 1st Battalion, Royal Norfolk Regiment
 Private Walter W. Fiddaman (1896-1916), 1st Battalion, Royal Norfolk Regiment
 Private Albert E. Pitcher (d.1916), 1st Battalion, Royal Norfolk Regiment
 Private Samuel Proudfoot (1892-1917), 1/5th Battalion, Royal Norfolk Regiment
 Private William J. Billing (d.1916), 7th Battalion, Royal Norfolk Regiment
 Private Herbert Youngs (1895-1915), 7th Battalion, Royal Norfolk Regiment
 Private Charles W. B. Matsell (d.1917), 9th Battalion, Royal Norfolk Regiment
 Private William J. Skipper (d.1916), 7th Battalion, Queen's Royal Regiment (West Surrey)
 Private Percy Williamson (d.1918), 11th Battalion, Royal Sussex Regiment
 David Fernie
 George Lake
 Charles Purer
 John Ramsay
 Cyril Thompson-Large

And, the following for the Second World War:
 Captain A. J. Julian Cory-Wright (1917-1944), 181st (Field) Regiment, Royal Artillery
 Flying-Officer Anthony D. H. Hawley (1923-1943), Royal Air Force
 Lieutenant Johnathan F. Cory-Wright (d.1945), Scots Guards
 Lieutenant David Gilliat (1922-1944), Royal Wiltshire Yeomanry
 Aircraftwoman-Second Class Phyllis M. Duffield (d.1942), Women's Auxiliary Air Force
 Lance-Bombardier Herbert E. Sutherland (1914-1943), Leicestershire Yeomanry, Royal Artillery

And, the following for the Berlin Blockade:
 John Sharp, DFC

Notable people
John Brancastre (died 1218), churchman and administrator, was Vicar of Brancaster and was probably born in the village.
John Weatherhead (1775–1797), Royal Navy officer, was born here, son of a Rector
Captain Sir William Bolton (1777–1830), Royal Navy officer, grew up at Brancaster, where his father was Rector.
Herbert Reeve (1868–1956), Rector of Brancaster 1924 to 1945
Felicity Tree (1894–1978), socialite daughter of Herbert Beerbohm Tree, lived at Brancaster

References

http://kepn.nottingham.ac.uk/map/place/Norfolk/Brancaster

References
 Ordnance Survey (2002). OS Explorer Map 250 – Norfolk Coast West. .
 Office for National Statistics & Norfolk County Council (2001). Census population and household counts for unparished urban areas and all parishes. Retrieved 2 December 2005.
'Suffolk Norfolk Life', No. 236, April 2009, pp 12–16; No. 251, July 2010, pp 32–35;& No. 263, July 2011, pp 32–36 (John Ramm)

External links

Brancaster Staithe and Burnham Deepdale Guide to these two villages and the beautiful north Norfolk coast
Information from Genuki Norfolk on Brancaster.

 
Villages in Norfolk
Populated coastal places in Norfolk
Civil parishes in Norfolk
Beaches of Norfolk
King's Lynn and West Norfolk